The discography of musical duo Beach House consists of eight studio albums, one compilation album, four extended plays, and 26 singles. The group was formed in Baltimore, Maryland by Victoria Legrand as a vocalist and keyboardist, and Alex Scally as a guitarist, keyboardist, and backup vocalist. They met in 2004 through Baltimore's indie rock scene, and would release their self-titled debut album Beach House in 2006.

Albums

Studio albums

Compilation albums

Extended plays

Singles

Notes

References 

Discographies of American artists
Pop music discographies